Patrick Robert Enthoven (born 1943/1944) is a South African insurance broker, the founder and former chairman of Hollard Group, South Africa's largest privately owned insurance group.

Early life
Patrick Robert Enthoven was born circa 1943/1944. He has a BA degree from the University of Cape Town.

Career
Enthoven founded Hollard in 1980, and named it after Hollard Street in Johannesburg, which was where the stock exchange was based, "We thought it added just a little bit of respectability."

In 2011, his son Dick Enthoven succeeded him as chairman of Hollard Group.

References

1944 births
Living people
University of Cape Town alumni
South African company founders